Fritz Harnest (1905 in Munich, Germany – 1999 in Traunstein, Germany), was a German painter, printmaker and collage artist.  He was a creator of abstract modern art in Germany after World War II.

Biography 
Harnest studied at the Academy of Fine Arts, Munich from 1921 to 1929. He travelled frequently to France in 1930–1931 with the German painter .  He ceased painting after the Nazi seizure of power but later resumed his career, creating woodcuts and murals. From 1940 to 1945 he worked as an interpreter in Stalag VII-A in Moosburg. In 1959 he was a participant of II. documenta in Kassel.

Art in public space

Honours 
 1961: 2nd prize at the „II. Internationalen Triennale Grenchen“ for colored original graphics, Switzerland
 1969: medal of honor at the “Triennale Internazionale della Xilographia Contemporanea Capri”, Italy 
 1996: Bundesverdienstkreuz der Bundesrepublik Deutschland

Further reading 
 
 Joseph Harnest, Stephan Harnest, Peter Schunda: Fritz Harnest – Das eigene Ringen um die Kunst., Übersee 2007, .
 Ruth Negendanck: Künstlerlandschaft Chiemsee. Fischerhude 2008, S. 179–204.

External links 

 
 Fritz Harnest in the Toledo Museum of Art, Ohio]
 Fritz Harnest in: Berkeley Library  in the University of California

References

1905 births
1999 deaths
Abstract painters
20th-century German painters
20th-century German male artists
German male painters
Artists from Munich
Recipients of the Cross of the Order of Merit of the Federal Republic of Germany